Limnaecia trixantha is a moth in the family Cosmopterigidae. It is found in Australia, where it has been recorded from Queensland.

References

Natural History Museum Lepidoptera generic names catalog

Limnaecia
Moths described in 1920
Moths of Australia